H1 histone family, member N, testis-specific is a member of the histone family of nuclear proteins which are a component of chromatin.  In humans, this protein is encoded by the H1FNT gene.

The H1FNT protein is essential for nuclear formation in spermatozoa, and is involved in the replacement of histones with protamines during spermiogenesis.

References

External links